Frontier Martial-Arts Wrestling was a Japanese hardcore wrestling promotion founded by Atsushi Onita in 1989. The event held its first card on October 6, 1989 and the first supercard was titled Battle Creation which took place on December 10, 1989. The event held many supercards and the most prestigious show was the FMW Anniversary Show. The company conducted many supercards until 1997 and then produced its first pay-per-view event Entertainment Wrestling Live on April 30, 1998 and continued to broadcast shows via pay-per-view until the promotion closed in 2002.

Supercards

1989

1990

1991

1992

1993

1994

1995

1996

1997

1998

1999

2001

Pay-per-views

1998

1999

2000

2001

2002

Tours

1995

1996

1997

1998

1999

2000

2001

Number of events by year

Supercards 
 1989 – 3
 1990 – 6
 1991 – 1
 1992 – 2
 1993 – 4
 1994 – 3
 1995 – 3
 1996 – 4
 1997 – 4
 1998 – 1
 1999 – 1
 2000 – 8
 2001 – 3

Pay-per-view events 
 1998 – 10
 1999 – 13
 2000 – 14
 2001 – 21
 2002 – 2

Tours 
 1995 – 1
 1996 – 8
 1997 – 13
 1998 – 13
 1999 – 12
 2000 – 12
 2001 – 11
 Total –  173'''

See also

List of All Elite Wrestling pay-per-view events
List of ECW supercards and pay-per-view events
List of Global Force Wrestling events and specials
List of Impact Wrestling pay-per-view events
List of Major League Wrestling events
List of National Wrestling Alliance pay-per-view events
List of NJPW pay-per-view events
List of NWA/WCW closed-circuit events and pay-per-view events
List of Ring of Honor pay-per-view events
List of Smokey Mountain Wrestling supercard events
List of WCW Clash of the Champions shows
List of WWA pay-per-view events
List of World Class Championship Wrestling Supercard events
List of WWE pay-per-view and WWE Network events
List of WWE Saturday Night Main Event shows
List of WWE Tribute to the Troops shows

External links
FMW Wrestling

Professional wrestling-related lists
Frontier Martial-Arts Wrestling